Lasse Vigen Christensen (born 15 August 1994) is a Danish professional footballer who plays as a midfielder for Danish Superliga club Silkeborg.

Club career

Early career
Born in Esbjerg, Denmark, Christensen began his football career at Esbjerg fB at age 5. While still at Esbjerg, he went on a trial with Arsenal, in the end, however, he decided to move to the FC Midtjylland-academy.

A year and a half into his time at Midtjylland, he went on a trial with Fulham in November 2011. A few months later, in January 2012, he moved to Fulham on a permanent deal. Shortly after the move, he was assigned to the club's development squad. Over the years, his progression through the Fulham ranks earned him praised and leading to being trained with the first team. Whilst there, he also became the club's U18 captain.

Fulham

Christensen made his Fulham debut in the FA Cup third round draw against Norwich City at Carrow Road and came on as a substitute for Steve Sidwell in the 84th minute during the replay at Craven Cottage. On 30 January 2014, Christensen signed a three-year contract extension, keeping him at Fulham until the summer of 2017.

The 2014–15 season saw Christensen being promoted to the first team and was featured more in the first team under the management of Kit Symons. He then scored his first goal for the club on 1 October 2014, in a 4–0 win over Bolton Wanderers. He then played a vital role, assisting three times against Norwich City, Rotherham United and Charlton Athletic, before scoring in a 3-3 draw against Wigan Athletic. By the end of 2014, Christensen added three more goals, putting his tally to 5, including against Sheffield Wednesday, for which named Man of the Match. However, he suffered a hamstring injury twice, including another that kept him out for the rest of the season. At the end of the 2014–15 season, Christensen made the total of 30 appearances and scoring fives times in all competitions. He finished third place in both the club's 2014–15 Player of the Season and the Goal of the Season awards.

In the 2015–16 season, Christensen continued to remain in the first team despite facing competitions and resulted being substituted on the bench. However, he suffered an injury during the international break and sidelined for a month. It wasn't until on 26 December 2015 when he returned to the first team, coming on as a second-half substitute, in a 2–0 loss against Derby County. He then scored again on 12 January 2016, in a 3–2 loss against Wolverhampton Wanderers. However, he was sidelined with a hamstring injury after sustaining into the first five minutes to the game against Queens Park Rangers on 13 February 2016. He then returned from the injury two months later on 9 April 2016 and set up a goal, in a 2–1 win over Cardiff City. At the end of the 2015-16 season, Christensen made the total of 31 appearances and scoring once in all competitions.

In the 2016–17 season, Christensen was featured in the first team at the start of the season and scored in a 3–2 win over Middlesbrough in the second round of the League Cup. Following a handful of first team football, he signed a one-year contract extension, keeping him until 2018. However, Christensen's first team opportunities was soon limited and was demoted to the club's reserve by the end of the year Whilst at Fulham, he went on to make the total of 7 appearances and scoring once in all competitions.

Burton Albion (loan)
On 27 January 2017, Christensen joined Burton Albion on loan until the end of the season, along with Cauley Woodrow.

The next day, Christensen made his debut for the club, where he made his first start, in a 2–1 win over Queens Park Rangers. After the match, he was named Team of the Week for the side. Since making his debut, Christensen established himself in the Burton Albion first team and was involved in a squad when they beat Leeds United on 22 April 2017, a win that helped his parent club's more hopes of reaching the play-off and Burton Albion's hopes of staying in the Championship for another season. At the end of the 2016–17 season, having made the total of 13 appearances, he, along with Woodrow, returned to their parent club.

Brøndby
On 18 July 2017, Christensen signed with Danish club Brøndby IF on a four-year contract. He was previously linked with a move to Sheffield United and Celtic over the summer.

Christensen had an immediate impact, scoring four goals in his first two Superliga games, including a debut goal in a 3–2 defeat to FC Nordsjælland and an off-the-bench hat–trick in a 5–3 win against Lyngby. For this feat, Christensen was named the July 2017 Superliga player of the month. Since making his debut for Brøndby IF, Christensen established himself in the starting eleven for the side. Two months later, on 20 September 2017, he scored again in a 5–1 win over Ledøje-Smørum Fodbold in the fifth round of the DBU Pokalen.

On 24 May 2021, Christensen scored Brøndby's first goal in their 2–0 win over FC Nordsjælland. The result confirmed Brøndby as Danish Superliga champions for the first time 16 years.

Zulte Waregem
On 21 June 2021, Christensen agreed to sign for Belgian First Division A club Zulte Waregem on a two-year contract starting 1 July. The deal included an option for an additional year. He made his debut for the club on 24 July in a 1–1 away draw against OH Leuven, playing the entire match.

Silkeborg
On 7 February 2023, Vigen signed a five-month contract with Danish Superliga club Silkeborg, joining the club on a free transfer.

International career
Christensen previously represented Denmark levels. In August 2013, Christensen was called up by Denmark U21 for the first time. He scored his Denmark U21 debut on 10 September 2013, in a 2-2 draw against Slovenia U21. For the next two years, Christensen scored a brace on two occasions against Estonia U21 and Russia U21. He was then given a captain armband for the match against Germany U21 on 3 September 2015, in a 2–1 defeat.

In May 2016, Christensen expressed interest to be called up into the squad for Denmark at the 2016 Olympic Games in Rio de Janeiro. It came after when he was called by the national team. However, manager Slaviša Jokanović prevented this from happening, and told Christensen that "the club's needs were greater than his country's" and left Christensen disappointed.

In June 2015, Christensen was called up by the senior team for the first team and appeared as an unused substitute against Montenegro soon after.

Career statistics

Personal life
Christensen grew up supporting Premier League side Arsenal, whom he went on a trial early in his career. Christensen said he wanted to be a footballer when he grows up and revealed that his father, a footballer, once played for the Denmark U21 side.

Honours
Brøndby
Danish Superliga: 2020–21
Danish Cup: 2017–18

References

External links

Danish national team profile
Fulham F.C. profile

1994 births
Living people
People from Esbjerg
Danish men's footballers
Danish expatriate men's footballers
Denmark youth international footballers
Denmark under-21 international footballers
Association football midfielders
Fulham F.C. players
Esbjerg fB players
FC Midtjylland players
Burton Albion F.C. players
Brøndby IF players
S.V. Zulte Waregem players
Silkeborg IF players
English Football League players
Danish Superliga players
Belgian Pro League players
Danish expatriate sportspeople in England
Danish expatriate sportspeople in Belgium
Expatriate footballers in England
Expatriate footballers in Belgium
Sportspeople from the Region of Southern Denmark